Jeffrey Joseph Walsh (born November 29, 1965) is an American prelate of the Catholic Church who serves as bishop of the Diocese of Gaylord.

Biography
Jeffrey Walsh was born on November 29, 1965, in Scranton, Pennsylvania. On June 25, 1994, Walsh was ordained to the priesthood for the Diocese of Scranton by Bishop James Timlin.

Pope Francis appointed Walsh as bishop of the Diocese of Gaylord on December 21, 2021. Walsh was consecrated as bishop by Archbishop Allen Vigneron on March 4, 2022.

See also
 Catholic Church hierarchy
 Catholic Church in the United States
 Historical list of the Catholic bishops of the United States
 List of Catholic bishops of the United States
 Lists of patriarchs, archbishops, and bishops

References

External links
Roman Catholic Diocese of Gaylord Official Site 
Roman Catholic Diocese of Scranton Official Site

Episcopal succession

  
 

1965 births
Living people
American Roman Catholic priests
Bishops appointed by Pope Francis
People from Scranton, Pennsylvania